Lot 24 is a township in Queens County, Prince Edward Island, Canada.  It is part of Charlotte Parish. Lot 24 was awarded to Charles Lee and Francis MacLeane in the 1767 land lottery. It was sold in arrears for quitrent in 1781 and a portion was granted to Loyalists in 1783.

Communities

Incorporated municipalities:

 Miltonvale Park
 North Rustico
 Stanley Bridge, Hope River, Bayview, Cavendish and North Rustico

Civic address communities:

 Anglo Rustico
 Brookfield
 Cavendish
 Cymbria
 Ebenezer
 Greenvale
 Mayfield
 New Glasgow
 North Milton
 Oyster Bed
 Oyster Bed Bridge
 South Rustico
 Wheatley River

References

24
Geography of Queens County, Prince Edward Island